The Haw River is a tributary of the Cape Fear River, approximately 110 mi (177 km) long, that is entirely contained in north central North Carolina in the United States. It was first documented as the "Hau River" by John Lawson, an English botanist, in his 1709 book "A New Voyage to Carolina." The name is shortened from Saxapahaw, from the Catawban /sak'yápha:/, "piedmont, foothill", from /sak/, "hill", plus /yápha:/, "step". The river gives its name to a small town that formed on its banks.

Course
The Haw rises in the Piedmont country, in northeast Forsyth County, near the border with Guilford County just north of Kernersville.  The river flows northeast, passing north of Oak Ridge and Summerfield into southern Rockingham County, passing through Haw River State Park, north of Greensboro.  The river then begins to flow southeast as it moves through the corner of Guilford County into Alamance County.

In Alamance County, the Haw flows through Ossipee and passes north of Burlington, and through the unincorporated community of Carolina.  It goes through the town of Haw River.  It flows south and is joined by Great Alamance Creek at Swepsonville and continues on to Saxapahaw.  The river forms the southeast border of Alamance County, a border shared by Orange County and Chatham County.

The course of the Haw River continues southeast in Chatham County as it flows just north of Pittsboro.

Natural history
The Haw River is home to many examples of local wildlife, including blue heron, beaver, deer, otter, bluegill bream, and these are only a few of the wild animals living at the Haw River.

History
The river played a major role in the life of Native Americans in the area, including the Sissipahau Indians, and in the development of the communities that were built on the river.  The river was first dammed in Saxapahaw in the 1850s and used for textile mills through the 19th and 20th centuries, and was a major factor in helping Alamance County to rebuild its local economy following the devastation of the American Civil War.  Alamance Plaids, a popular textile during the 1800s, were developed near the present-day community of Glencoe.

During the 20th century, the river became heavily polluted by chemicals used in the production of textiles.  The decline of industry in the United States in the late 20th century has reduced pollution in the Haw River.  However, the Haw is still in danger of pollution from suburban nutrient runoff and sediment.  Efforts are underway to improve the ecology of the Haw River, but there is disagreement between various environmental groups, local governments, and economic interests as to how to proceed.  Recently, the newly revised Jordan Lake Rules have improved regulatory issues which affect future pollution.  Most sections of the Haw are clean by reports from the state Water Quality Section, securing it as a recreational and water supply asset.

Since the installation of the new, combined Durham Wastewater Treatment Plant (WWTP), Jordan Lake water tests clean as a water source, save one portion, the upper pool of the New Hope Creek. Occasionally, in the shallow, small upper pool, water from the WWTP raises nutrient levels above allowed limits. When normal flow is returned, they are safely diluted. Lower pools are not effected. Local and state governments cooperate and are often proactive in pollution prevention.

Economy

For over one hundred years, textile and other industries built the economy of North Carolina.  Many located along the Haw and other river basins, providing employment and centers for communities since the Civil War era.  Today, a few mills continue to operate near and on the Haw River, including Copland Mills in Burlington, NC.  The Haw also provides drinking water and recreational activities to a large portion of North Carolina, as 10% of the state's population lives in the Haw River Watershed.  The conservation of the Haw River is now the focus of several groups and government agencies, who are working to develop and preserve the Haw River.

Traditional farming has been the backbone of the economy in the rural counties lining the Haw.  Though farming is under pressure, it continues to thrive, providing poultry, beef, grain, and other products for American consumption, bolstering a main export of the state.

As a part of conservation efforts has been the development of three trails.  The Haw River Trail is a conservation and recreation initiative formally undertaken by local governments and private groups in 2006, and will provide both a land trail and paddle trail connecting Haw River State Park and Jordan Lake State Recreation Area.  The trail is part of the North Carolina Mountains to Sea Trail.

A second major trail that has been established by local governments is the Haw River Wine Trail.  The Haw River Valley has become a renowned grape growing region.  This trail was originally established with five wineries in Guilford and Alamance Counties.  Currently, four wineries are open on the trail, and all four have produced award-winning wines.  The fifth winery, a family-operated business, closed in January 2008.  There are several other wineries in the area that are not currently part of the trail.

The State of North Carolina has set up a state park on the Haw River in Guilford and Rockingham counties.  There are also several city and county parks and golf courses located on the Haw, including Greensboro National Golf Club in Guilford County; Indian Valley Golf Course, Great Bend Park at Glencoe, Town and Country Park, The Challenge Golf Club, Quarry Hills Country Club, Swepsonville River Park, and Southwick Golf Course in Alamance County; and Robeson Creek Recreation Area and New Hope Overlook Campground located at the Jordan Lake State Recreation Area in Chatham County.

Tributaries

Cities, towns, and communities

In Chatham County
Pittsboro
Haywood
Bynum

In Alamance County
Saxapahaw
Swepsonville
Graham
Haw River
Burlington
Carolina
Glencoe
Ossipee
Altamahaw

In Guilford County
Oak Ridge

In Forsyth County

Dams

The Haw River has been dammed many times throughout its history to provide power for mills, irrigation for crops, and drinking water supplies.  Some remnants of dams are still visible.  The following dams are still extant on the Haw River:

B. Everett Jordan Dam - 
Bynum Dam - 
Saxapahaw Dam - 
Puryear Dam - 
Old Swepsonville Dam - 
Granite Mills Dam (removed in 2016)
Glencoe Mills Dam - 
Indian Valley Dam
Altamahaw Dam -

References

External links
in order of development
 Haw River Assembly
 Haw River Canoe and Kayak Company
 Haw River Wine Trail
 Haw River Trail

Rivers of North Carolina
Rivers of Alamance County, North Carolina
Rivers of Chatham County, North Carolina
Rivers of Forsyth County, North Carolina
Rivers of Guilford County, North Carolina
Rivers of Orange County, North Carolina
Rivers of Rockingham County, North Carolina